Axel Gotthard (born April 21, 1959) is a German historian of modern age and university teacher.

Gotthard was born in Schwäbisch Gmünd. He studied at the University of Würzburg and the University of Tübingen. He works at the University of Erlangen-Nuremberg as university teacher.

References

1959 births
Living people
People from Schwäbisch Gmünd
20th-century German historians
Academic staff of the University of Erlangen-Nuremberg
21st-century German historians